The Centre de recherche politiques Raymond Aron is the research center of the Ecole des Hautes Etudes en Sciences Sociales that specializes in political philosophy.

Created by François Furet in 1982, the center's goal was to give a new basis to the study of politics in France and moving away from the dominant marxist paradigm. Its members have been at the forefront of the rediscovery of the French liberal tradition and the reintroduction of classical philosophy in contemporary political studies.

The center's seminars concentrate on a multidisciplinary approach (Philosophy, History, Sociology and Law).

The CRPRA holds seminars solely to Master and Doctorate students.

Members 

 Agnès Antoine
 François Azouvi
 Monique Canto-Sperber, also director of the École normale supérieure
 Vincent Descombes, also visiting professor at the University of Chicago
 Luc Foisneau
 Marcel Gauchet
 Patrice Gueniffey
 Ran Halévy
 Claude Lefort
 Catherine Maire
 Pierre Manent, also visiting professor at Boston College
 Mona Ozouf, Directrice de recherche, CNRS
 Philippe Raynaud, also member of l’Institut Universitaire de France
 Olivier Remaud
 Lucien Karpik

See also 

 http://crpra.ehess.fr/
 Raymond Aron

Research institutes in France
French National Centre for Scientific Research